Denis Chang Khen-lee, CBE, KC, SC, JP (born 15 February 1944, Sabah, Malaysia —) is a barrister and politician from Hong Kong.  

He was previously an appointed unofficial member of the Executive Council of Hong Kong (1992—97). He was also the chairman of the Hong Kong Bar Association (1985—87), the founding member of the pro-democratic group Article 45 Concern Group and became the member of the Civic Party when the group transformed into party.

Denis Chang's Chambers 
Chang formed his own chambers in 1978, and since then, a number of prominent barristers have been tenants.

Notable alumni 

 Johannes Chan SC (Hon.) — first and only honorary academic Senior Counsel in Hong Kong, specializing in public law and human rights
 Philip Dykes SC — former Hong Kong Bar Association chairman (2005–06, 2018–20)
 Paul Harris SC — former Hong Kong Bar Association chairman (2021)
 Jacqueline Leong KC SC — former Hong Kong Bar Association chairman (1992–93)
 Hectar Pun SC — prominent public and constitutional law Senior Counsel

References

1944 births
Living people
Hong Kong Senior Counsel
Members of the Executive Council of Hong Kong
Civic Party politicians
Barristers of Hong Kong
Hong Kong Basic Law Consultative Committee members
Alumni of the University of Bristol
Hong Kong people of Malaysian descent
Hong Kong Queen's Counsel